The 1878 FA Cup final was a football match between Wanderers and Royal Engineers on 23 March 1878 at Kennington Oval in London. It was the seventh final of the world's oldest football competition, the Football Association Challenge Cup (known in the modern era as the FA Cup). Wanderers had won the Cup in the previous two seasons and on four previous occasions in total, including the first FA Cup final, in 1872, in which they defeated the Engineers. The Engineers had also won the Cup, having defeated Old Etonians in the 1875 final.

Wanderers, who were considered firm favourites to win the Cup for the third consecutive season, took the lead after only five minutes through Jarvis Kenrick, but the Engineers quickly equalised. The cup-holders regained their lead before half-time and added a third goal after the interval to secure a 3–1 victory. Under the original rules of the competition, the Cup was retired and presented to the club on a permanent basis to mark their third straight win, but the Wanderers returned the Cup to The Football Association on the condition that it never again be won outright by any club.

Route to the final 

Wanderers were the reigning cup holders and had also won the tournament in 1872, 1873 and 1876. In the first of these victories they had defeated the Royal Engineers. The Engineers had won the competition in 1875. Both teams entered the competition at the first round stage. Wanderers were allocated a home tie against Panthers and easily defeated their opponents 9–1, proceeding to the second round where they were paired with High Wycombe and again recorded a high-scoring victory, winning 9–0. Their opponents in the third round, Barnes, proved stronger opposition, particularly as key players such as Hon. Arthur Kinnaird were unavailable for the cup-holders. The match ended in a 1–1 draw necessitating a replay, which Wanderers (back to full strength) won 4–1. In the quarter-finals Wanderers defeated Sheffield 3–0 and then, with an uneven number of teams remaining in the competition, the team received a bye into the final.

The Engineers' scheduled first round opponents were Highbury Union, but they withdrew from the competition, giving the Engineers a walkover victory. The "Sappers", as the Royal Engineers regiment is traditionally nicknamed, went on to defeat Pilgrims 6–0 and Druids 8–0, with hat-tricks in both matches from Lieut. Robert Hedley, to reach the quarter-finals where their opponents were 1874 cup-winners Oxford University. The initial match finished in a 3–3 draw, and the replay also finished without a victor, ending 2–2. Finally, the Engineers emerged victorious in a second replay, winning 4–2. This set up a semi-final match against Old Harrovians, the team for former pupils of Harrow School. The match was played at Kennington Oval and the Engineers reached the final by defeating the Harrovians 2–1.

Match

Summary 

Wanderers, who were considered the firm favourites by the book-makers, won the coin toss and chose to defend the Harleyford Road end of The Oval. The match drew a crowd estimated at 4,500 spectators, the highest yet recorded for an FA Cup final. Both teams played with two full-backs, two half-backs and six forwards; the team captains were the Hon. Arthur Kinnaird and Lieut. Robert Hedley. The cup-holders immediately dominated the game and Kinnaird quickly had an unsuccessful shot on goal. After only five minutes Henry Wace crossed the ball from a wide position and Jarvis Kenrick kicked the ball past the Engineers' goalkeeper Lieut. Lovick Friend to give the Wanderers the lead. Approximately ten minutes later, Wanderers goalkeeper James Kirkpatrick suffered a broken arm during a tussle on the goal-line, but managed to keep the ball out of the goal, and went on to play the remainder of the match despite his injury. In the 20th minute of the game, the Engineers scored an equalising goal. Some modern sources state that Lieut. William Morris scored the goal, however contemporary newspaper reports in The Field, The Sporting Life and Bell's Life in London all state that Morris took a throw-in which led to a "scrimmage" or "bully" in front of the Wanderers' goal, out of which the ball was forced over the goal-line.

Towards the end of the first half, the Wanderers were awarded a free kick. Kinnaird took the kick, which led to a second goal for the cup-holders. Modern sources list Kinnaird as the goalscorer, but some contemporary reports suggest that, following his free kick, another "scrimmage" ensued in front of the Engineers' goal before the ball was forced over the line. Shortly after the half-time break, the Engineers' captain Robert Hedley appeared to have scored a goal, but it was disallowed due to an infringement of the offside rule. After around twenty minutes of the second half, Kenrick scored his second goal following some skilful play by Hubert Heron, giving Wanderers a 3–1 lead which they retained until the end of the game.

Details 

Match rules:90 minutes normal time.30 minutes extra-time if scores are level, at captains' discretion.Replay if scores still level.No substitutes.

Post-match 
As was the norm until 1882, the winning team did not receive the trophy at the stadium on the day of the match, but later in the year at their annual dinner. Under the original rules of the competition, if a team won the Cup three times in succession, it would be retired and become their "absolute property". Wanderers secretary C. W. Alcock, however, returned the Cup to The Football Association on the condition that the rule be removed and no other team permitted to win the Cup outright. The only other team to win the Cup in three successive seasons to date is Blackburn Rovers, who won it three times in a row in the 1880s. On that occasion the club was presented with a commemorative shield.

Three weeks after the Cup final, Wanderers played Scottish Cup winners Vale of Leven at Kennington Oval in a match for the unofficial "championship of Britain". In front of a crowd of around 2,000 spectators, Wanderers turned in what was regarded by the press as a sub-standard performance and were defeated 3–1.

Notes 
A. The Football Club History Database incorrectly list this as a 2–2 draw. All other sources list the result as 1–1.

References 
General
 
 
 
Specific

External links 
 Match report at www.fa-cupfinals.co.uk
 FA Cup Final line-ups

1878
1877–78 in English football
1878 sports events in London
March 1878 sports events